Leo Florian Hauck (November 4, 1888 – January 21, 1950) was an American boxer. During his career he was able to achieve victories over many Hall of Famers including Jack Britton, Jack Dillon, Battling Levinsky, Frank Klaus, Billy Papke, Jeff Smith and Harry Lewis. He also faced the likes of Harry Greb, Gene Tunney and Mike Gibbons. He was inducted into the Ring Magazine hall of fame in 1969, the Pennsylvania Sports Hall of Fame in 1972, and enshrined within the International Boxing Hall of Fame as a part of the 2012 class.

Biography

He was born on November 4, 1888 in Lancaster, Pennsylvania. He began boxing in 1902 as a flyweight, and fought successfully in every weight division up to heavyweight.  Houck later served as the boxing coach at Penn State from 1922 to 1949, while also working as a boxing promoter in Lancaster (1931-32). Houck also worked as a referee and judge in the state of Pennsylvania. He died on January 21, 1950.

Professional boxing record
All information in this section is derived from BoxRec, unless otherwise stated.

Official record

All newspaper decisions are officially regarded as "no decision" bouts and are not counted in the win/loss/draw column.

Unofficial record

Record with the inclusion of newspaper decisions in the win/loss/draw column.

References

External links 
 

Boxers from Pennsylvania
1888 births
1950 deaths
Sportspeople from Lancaster, Pennsylvania
American male boxers
Featherweight boxers